Trish Hina (born 3 May 1977) is a female rugby union player. She has also represented New Zealand in rugby league, touch rugby and softball.

Hina was a member of the 2010 Women's Rugby World Cup winning squad.

In rugby league, Hina debuted for the national team in 1997, scoring five tries in the two Test matches against Australia. This performance was recognised by the New Zealand Rugby League with their Women's Player of the Year Award. Hina played against the touring Great Britain side in 1998. Hina participated in three Women's Rugby League World Cup tournaments: 2000, 2003 and 2008, all of which were won by New Zealand. Hina's last appearance for the Kiwi Ferns was in 2010.

References

External links
Black Ferns Profile

1977 births
Living people
New Zealand women's international rugby union players
New Zealand female rugby union players
Female rugby union players